Eesti Raudtee or EVR is the national railway infrastructure company of Estonia. Its sole shareholder is the Government of Estonia.

History
Shortly following the Estonian Restoration of Independence, the state-owned company Eesti Raudtee was established as the national railway company of Estonia on 1 January 1992. The company's activities primarily involved the movement of rail freight, particularly that of Russian oil products to the ice-free Estonian ports on the Baltic Sea; passenger services were typically provided by separate operators that ran upon Eesti Raudtee's infrastructure via a series of track access agreements.  

By mid-2000, it was announced that the Estonian government was seeking to privatise its railway operations. On 31 August 2001, 66 percent of the stock in the company was sold to Baltic Rail Services, a consortium of Rail World (25.5%), Jarvis (25.5%), Railroad Development Corporation (5%), and OÜ Ganiger Invest, led by Estonian entrepreneurs Jüri Käo and Guido Sammelselg (44%).

As a result of the privatisation, new management structures were promptly introduced to the company along with considerable investment aimed at instituting international best practices, amongst other goals. In 2002, Eesti Raudtee introduced a new logo along with a corporate identity during its tenth anniversary. The new logo was the two letters "E" and "R" that are coloured red and are merged to each other to symbolise the company's name.

Following an election in 2003, the Estonian government changed the rules on open access rights and capped the level of track access charges that can be imposed, which negatively impacted Eesti Raudtee's commercial viability, causing relations between Baltic Rail Services and the state to sour. In July 2005, Baltic Rail Services issued a notice of dispute to the Estonian government that claimed there had been a breach of bilateral investment treaties. By April 2006, the dispute between the two parties had reportedly escalated to the highest levels and the potential sale of the stake in Eesti Raudtee was mooted. During January 2007, Eesti Raudtee was effectively renationalised by the Estonian government, ending Baltic Rail Services' involvement.

During 2009, two new EVR wholly owned subsidiaries were formed: EVR Infra, responsible for managing the railway infrastructure, and EVR Cargo, which took over the parent company's freight operations. This reorganisation was reportedly to comply with European Union legislation. In 2012, freight operator AS EVR Cargo (renamed Operail in 2018) was separated from Eesti Raudtee; around the same time, EVR Infra was renamed Eesti Raudtee.

The late 2010s and early 2020s were marked by a series of investments in Estonia's railway infrastructure. In December 2017, work was completed on the modernisation of 57km of the key Tapa – Tartu line, facilitating passenger trains to be run at a maximum speed of 120 km/h while freight trains were also permitted to move at up to 80 km/h. Between 2018 and 2021, the Lääne – Harju line running west from Tallinn was resignalled by Mipro. In July 2020, the launch of a decade-long investment programme, aimed at raising quality and safety levels, was announced. During December 2020, a joint venture of Spanish engineering companies Ardanuy Ingeneria and Ayesa Ingenieria y Arquitectura were awarded a €3.7m contract to produce the technical requirements and preliminary designs of an 25 kV 50 Hz electrification programme covering almost the entirety of Estonia's unelectrified railway network.

During May 2018, the company, together with the railway companies of Latvia and Lithuania, signed an agreement to jointly establish the Amber Train freight transportation route from Šeštokai through Riga to Tallinn. As one part of this initiative, a new multimodal freight terminal directly connected to the port of Muuga was constructed, facilitating the transshipping of goods between the sea and the Estonian railway network. On 13 September 2022, the first Amber Train service departed Muuga for the Kaunas terminal; goods from the terminal will also be transported to Muuga on the return journey, the majority of which will be sent onwards to Finland.

References

External links

Estonian brands
Railway companies established in 1992
Railway companies of Estonia
Railway infrastructure managers
Companies based in Tallinn
1992 establishments in Estonia
Government-owned companies of Estonia